The Sauber C35 is a Formula One racing car designed by Sauber to compete in the 2016 Formula One season. The car was driven by Marcus Ericsson and Felipe Nasr, and used the Ferrari 061 power unit.

The chassis was designed by Mark Smith, Eric Gandelin, Elliot Dason-Barber and Seamus Mullarkey with the car being powered with a customer Ferrari powertrain.

Competitiveness
During the first half of the season, the car proved to be less competitive compared to its predecessor due to less development over winter, caused by financial problems of the team.

The team scored its only points of the season during the dramatic 2016 Brazilian Grand Prix in very wet conditions. The team also overtook their nearest rivals, Manor, in the constructors' championship when Felipe Nasr crossed the line in 9th, which was enough to give them 10th place in the constructors' championship.

Complete Formula One results
(key) (results in bold indicate pole position; results in italics indicate fastest lap)

References

External links

 The C35 on Sauber's official website

C35
2016 Formula One season cars